The 2010 Jelajah Malaysia, a cycling stage race that took place in Malaysia. It was held from 27 April to 1 May 2010. There were five stages with a total of 822.1 kilometres. In fact, the race was sanctioned by the Union Cycliste Internationale as a 2.2 category race and was part of the 2009–10 UCI Asia Tour calendar.

David McCann of Ireland won the race, followed by Takumi Beppu of Japan second and Amir Rusli of Malaysia third overall. Malcolm Lange of South Africa won the points classification and Matnur of Indonesia won the mountains classification.  won the team classification.

Stages

Classification leadership

Final standings

General classification

Points classification

Mountains classification

Team classification

Asian rider classification

Asian team classification

Malaysian rider classification

Malaysian team classification

Stage results

Stage 1
27 April 2010 — Kuala Selangor to Teluk Batik,

Stage 2
28 April 2010 — Teluk Batik to Taiping,

Stage 3
29 April 2010 — Taiping to Juru,

Stage 4
30 April 2010 — Juru to Sungai Petani,

Stage 5
1 May 2010 — Sungai Petani to Kuala Perlis,

List of teams and riders
A total of 19 teams were invited to participate in the 2010 Jelajah Malaysia. Out of 112 riders, a total of 80 riders made it to the finish in Kuala Perlis.

Aisan Racing Team
  Takumi Beppu
  Masahiro Shinagawa
  Kenichi Suzuki
  Mitsuhiro Matsumura
  Shinpei Fukuda
  Kazuhiro Mori

  David McCann
  Prajak Mahawong
  Chang Wei Kei
  Rasoul Barati
  Peng Kuei Hsiang
  Alex Coutts

  Ng Yong Li
  Mohd Hafiz Rozli
  Adrian Chuah Wye Kit
  Mohd Razif Mohd Salleh
  Mark O'Brien
  Paul Witmitz Samuel
Polygon Sweet Nice
  Serguei Kudentsov
  Hari Fitrianto
  Rastra Patria Dinawan
  Herwin Jaya
  Matnur
  Roman Krasilnikov
Vali ASR Kerman Team
  Saied Nateghi
  Jalil Eslami
  Mohammad Zangi Abadi
  Alireza Asgharzadeh
  Seyed Mostafa Seyedrezaei
  Seyed Moezeddin Seyedrezaei
Medscheme Cycling Team
  Malcolm Lange
  Hanco Kachelhoffer
  Johann Rabie
  Waylon Woolcock
  Luthando Kaka
  Arran Brown

OCBC Singapore Continental Cycling Team
  Junaidi Hashim
  Ang Kee Meng
  Lemnel Lee Yun Jie
  Vincent Ang
  Melvin Kow
  Goh Choon Huat
Custom Cycling Club
  Erik Suprianto
  Heksa Priya Prasetya
  Iwan Setiawan
  Parno
  A. Agung Syahbana
  Endra Wisaya
Malaysia
  Mohd Rizal Tisin
  Muhd Syamil Baharum
  Mohamed Harrif Salleh
  Adiq Husainie Othman
  Mohammad Akmal Amrun
  Amir Rusli
Brunei
  Mohd Halid Sata
  Reduan Yusop
  Muhammad Raihaan Abd Aziz
  Md Arbe Shadatul Farrani Zainul Ariffin
  Md. Rafiuddin Zakaria
Indonesia
  Muhamad Taufik
  Nugroho Kisnanto
  Didit Purwanto
  Dadi Suryadi
  Nunung Burhanudin
  Arin Iswana

Majlis Sukan Negara Malaysia
  Muaz Abd Rahim
  Aeliff Mohd Amin Alimen
  Mohd Anaz Norman
  Mohd Shahidan Shariff
  Mohd Farhan Amri Zaid
  Mohd Hafiz Mohd Zarawi
Kuala Lumpur
  Wan Mohd Najmee Wan Mohamad
  Ahmad Fallanie Ali
  Mohd Khuzairi Abu Bakar
  Suhardi Hassan
  Mohd Amin Amiruddin
  Mohd Hassannudin Wan
  Mohd Syami Faris Tajuddin
Selangor
  Mohamad Hafiz Mohamed Sufian
  Sarham Miswan
  Muhammad Azmi Mohammad Ali
  Shahrin Amir
  Norshahriel Haizat Ahmad Nazali
  Muhammad Elmi Jumari
Terengganu
  Syed Mohd Hussaini Syed Mazlan
  Mohd Nor Umardi Rosdi
  Mohd Saufie Mat Senan
  Mohd Faiz Syarifuddin Abd Kadir
  Mohd Shobry Abdullah
  Yusrizal Yusof

Sabah
  Nicklos Minol
  Marvin George
  Muhd Nur Hafiah Osman
  Chai Eng Hou
  Mohamad Zulkifli Mohamad Rosejati
  Raijesy Ryner R. Anang
Malaysian Armed Forces
  Mohamed Zamri Salleh
  Mohd Nur Rizuan Zainal
  Mohd Shahrul Mat Amin
  Mohd Shahrul Afiza Fauzan
  Mohd Fadhli Anwar Mohd Fauzi
  Amirul Aswandi Amran
Pahang
  Mohamad Aim Mohamad Fauzi
  Mohd Yazrul Hisham Zulkifli
  Mohad Shawal Mohd Shafee
  Mohd Zarif Mohd Hashim
  Ahmad Fakrullah Alias
  Mohd Hazfiz Azeman
Johor
  Muhamad Firdaus Daud
  Muhamad Rizal Muhamad
  Mohd Shahelmie Abd Karim
  Mohd Nazri Muhamad
  Khairul Naim Azhar
  M. Fakhruddin Daud

External links
 
 Palmares at cyclingarchives.com
 Results at cqranking.com

Jelajah Malaysia
Jelajah Malaysia
Jelajah Malaysia, 2010